This list of people associated with Princeton University includes graduates who have served in the national government of the United States.

Senate
The United States Senate is the upper house of Congress. Princetonians have a long history of service in the Senate. The Senate of the First Congress included three Princeton alumni (Oliver Ellsworth of Connecticut, William Paterson of New Jersey, and John Henry of Maryland), two more who attended Princeton but did not graduate (John Brown of Virginia, later Kentucky, and Benjamin Hawkins of North Carolina), and one Princeton Trustee (Jonathan Elmer of New Jersey). Alexander Leitch wrote in 1978 of the Senate, "Since its establishment in 1789 it has been without a Princetonian only twenty years." This is still the case: Claiborne Pell served 1961–97, Kit Bond served 1987–2011, Jeff Merkley has served since 2009, and Ted Cruz has served since 2013. If Cruz completes his current term, he will represent Princeton in the Senate through 2025. Princetonians have represented 26 of the 50 U.S. states in the Senate.

John Brown served in the Senate first from Virginia and then from Kentucky after its admission as a state. He is listed twice for convenience of sorting by state.

House of Representatives
The House of Representatives is the lower house of Congress. Princetonians have a long history of service in the House. Alexander Leitch noted in 1978 that the House "has not been without a Princeton alumnus in its membership in any year since it first met in 1789." As of 2015, this remains the case.

Princetonians have served 24 of the 50 U.S. states in the House. Two served as nonvoting delegates from Arkansas Territory and Michigan Territory before these territories became states.

U.S. Supreme Court
The Supreme Court of the United States is the nation's highest court. Of the 112 justices to have served on the Supreme Court, 12 have been Princetonians. Three current justices are Princeton graduates. Oliver Ellsworth was the second Chief Justice of the United States; all others listed here were or are Associate Justices of the Supreme Court of the United States.

Continental Congress
The First Continental Congress met in Philadelphia in 1774 to plan the colonies' response to the punitive Intolerable Acts passed by the British Parliament earlier that year. When the Congress's appeal to the British government failed, the Second Continental Congress convened, again in Philadelphia. Meeting 1775–81, it issued the Declaration of Independence and was the provisional government of the United States during the Revolutionary War. It reorganized in 1781 following the adoption of the Articles of Confederation, under which it was known formally as the Congress of the Confederation. Between 1781 and 1789, this body met in several locations, including in Nassau Hall on the Princeton campus for about four months in 1783. It disbanded in 1789 following the ratification of the Constitution.

Princetonians represented each of the 13 states except Massachusetts in the Continental Congress. Four of them signed the Declaration of Independence; they are indicated by asterisks (*). Among them was John Witherspoon, a delegate from New Jersey and then the President of Princeton. Trained as a Presbyterian minister, Witherspoon was the only clergyman in the Continental Congress and served often as the body's chaplain. His experience on representative bodies in the ministry prepared him to be especially effective and influential in Congress, where he is said to have served on more committees than any other member.

Constitutional Convention
The impotence of the national government under the Articles of Confederation prompted the Constitutional Convention, which met in Philadelphia between 25 May and 17 September 1787. This assembly wrote the Constitution of the United States, which came into effect in 1789 after nine states had ratified it.

Princetonians represented six of the 12 states that sent delegations to the convention. (Rhode Island declined to send a delegation.) Ten of the 56 delegates were Princetonians, including four of the five delegates from New Jersey. This compares with five delegates each from the College of William & Mary and Yale College, three each from Harvard College and Columbia College, two from the University of Pennsylvania, and one each from the University of Oxford and the University of Glasgow.

James Madison was the first delegate to arrive at the convention and was so influential there that he came to be known as the "Father of the Constitution". He also argued for the Constitution's ratification in The Federalist Papers, written together with Alexander Hamilton and John Jay. As a Representative in the 1st United States Congress, he introduced the Bill of Rights, which became the first ten Amendments to the Constitution.

William Paterson and Oliver Ellsworth were also influential at the convention. In response to Madison's Virginia Plan, under which states would be represented in Congress in proportion to their population and taxes paid, Paterson authored the New Jersey Plan, which called for equal representation for each state. Together with his Connecticut colleague Roger Sherman, Ellsworth crafted the Connecticut Compromise, also called the Great Compromise, which blended the two plans. This plan, which specified a bicameral legislature with one house apportioned by population and the other in which the states would be represented equally, became the basis for the House of Representatives and Senate in the final Constitution.

Signers of the Constitution are indicated with asterisks (*).

See also 
List of Princeton University people
List of Princeton University people (government)

References 

People